Khorloogiin Bayanmönkh (born 22 February 1944) is a retired Mongolian wrestler. At the 1972 Summer Olympics he won the silver medal in the men's freestyle heavyweight category.  His name Bayanmonkh means "Rich eternal" in the Mongolian language.

Bayanmönkh is the second most successful wrestler in Mongolian wrestling with 10 championship wins (1968, 1971–1973, 1975, 1977, 1979, 1981–1982, 1987). 

In 1972 he was awarded the title of Merited Master of Sport of the USSR.

References

External links
 
 
 

1944 births
Living people
People from Uvs Province
Olympic wrestlers of Mongolia
Wrestlers at the 1964 Summer Olympics
Wrestlers at the 1968 Summer Olympics
Wrestlers at the 1972 Summer Olympics
Wrestlers at the 1976 Summer Olympics
Wrestlers at the 1980 Summer Olympics
Mongolian male sport wrestlers
Mongolian sambo practitioners
Olympic silver medalists for Mongolia
Olympic medalists in wrestling
Asian Games medalists in wrestling
Honoured Masters of Sport of the USSR
Wrestlers at the 1974 Asian Games
Asian Games gold medalists for Mongolia
Asian Games silver medalists for Mongolia
Medalists at the 1974 Asian Games
World Wrestling Championships medalists
Medalists at the 1972 Summer Olympics
World Wrestling Champions
20th-century Mongolian people
21st-century Mongolian people